Carl T. "Rocky" Herakovich (born August 6, 1937) is an American retired engineering professor, college football player, coach and official. He served as the head football coach at Rose Polytechnic Institute—now known as Rose-Hulman Institute of Technology—from 1962 to 1963, compiling a record of 3–13. Herakovich was the founding director of the NASA-Virginia Tech Composites Program at Virginia Tech and Director of Applied Mechanics and the Henry L Kinnier Professor of civil engineering at the University of Virginia. 

He led the nation in scoring in 1958 with 168 points in 8 games.

References

1937 births
Living people
College track and field coaches in the United States
Illinois Institute of Technology alumni
Rose–Hulman Fightin' Engineers athletic directors
Rose–Hulman Fightin' Engineers football coaches
Rose–Hulman Fightin' Engineers football players
University of Kansas alumni
University of Virginia faculty
Virginia Tech faculty
Sportspeople from East Chicago, Indiana
People from Whiting, Indiana
Coaches of American football from Indiana
Players of American football from Indiana